Springfield is an unincorporated community in west Jim Wells County in the U.S. state of Texas. It is located between the cities of San Diego and Alice south of Highway 44.

History
Springfield is at Farm Roads 625 and 3087, about three miles southeast of San Diego and seven miles northwest of Alice in west central Jim Wells County. The community was established when the Texas Mexican Railway built across the county in the early 1880s. A post office was established at Springfield in 1909, and in 1910 the community's population was estimated at about 100, though by 1914 the number of residents had decreased to eight. The post office closed in 1918. A county highway map made in the 1930s showed Springfield with a school and scattered dwellings. During the late 1980s it was a dispersed rural community.

External links

Unincorporated communities in Jim Wells County, Texas
Unincorporated communities in Texas